In linguistics, the term specialization (as defined by Paul Hopper), refers to one of the five principles by which grammaticalization can be detected while it is taking place. The other four principles are: layering, divergence, persistence, and de-categorialization.

Specialization refers to the narrowing of choices that characterizes an emergent grammatical construction. The lexical meaning of a grammaticalizing feature decreases in scope, so that in time the feature conveys a generalized grammatical meaning.

"Within a functional domain, at one stage a variety of forms with different semantic nuances may be possible; as grammaticalization takes place, this variety of formal choices narrows and the smaller number of forms selected assume more general grammatical meanings." (Hopper 1991: 22)

References 

 Lessau, Donald A. A Dictionary of Grammaticalization. Bochum: Brockmeyer, 1994.
 Hopper, Paul J. "On some principles of grammaticization". In Elizabeth Closs Traugott and Bernd Heine, eds. Approaches to Grammaticalization, Vol. I. Amsterdam: John Benjamins, 1991. pp. 17–36.

Historical linguistics